Bríet (born 1999) is an Icelandic singer.

Bríet may also refer to:
 Bríet Sif Hinriksdóttir, Icelandic basketball player
 Bríet Bjarnhéðinsdóttir, Icelandic women's right activist
 Bríet Kristý Gunnarsdóttir, Icelandic professional racing cyclist